"You Don't Even Know Who I Am" is a song written by Gretchen Peters and recorded by American country music artist Patty Loveless.  It was released in March 1995 as the third single from Loveless's album When Fallen Angels Fly.

Content
The song is a ballad that describes the end of a marriage where both spouses realize they have become complete strangers over time.

The first verse describes the wife's decision to leave her ring on the pillow in their bedroom and a letter on the fridge, describing her feelings of distance towards her husband.

The second verse describes the husband's reaction of the events. He thinks about what he saw and reciprocates her feelings of distance, citing he feels the same way about the state of their marriage.

Music video
The music video premiered on CMT March 20, 1995, and was directed by Jim Shea.

Background

According to Loveless, "The one that got a lot of reaction was "You Don't Even Know Who I Am." It starts out and you think, "Okay, here's another woman crying about something," and then it swings around and it says he finds her ring on the pillow and he starts to think, "Hey, you didn't know who I was either." They got to the point in their marriage that they didn't know each other anymore. There's been a lot of men that this song just tears up. I've often said that country is the cheapest therapy you can get. Music can be good for your soul. People can be moved to tears."

"You Don't Even Know Who I Am" was nominated for 1996 Academy of Country Music Award Song of the Year award and the Grammy Award for Best Country Song.
 
The song charted for 20 weeks on the Billboard Hot Country Singles and Tracks chart, reaching number 5 during the week of June 17, 1995. It was written by Gretchen Peters.

Chart positions

Year-end charts

References

1994 singles
Patty Loveless songs
Songs written by Gretchen Peters
Country ballads
Song recordings produced by Emory Gordy Jr.
Epic Records singles
1994 songs